Jean Mabire (8 February 1927—29 March 2006) was a French journalist and essayist. A neo-pagan and nordicist, Mabire is known for the regionalist and euronationalist ideas that he developed in both Europe-Action and GRECE, as well as his controversial books on the Waffen-SS.

Biography

Early life 
Jean Pol Yves Jacques Mabire was born in Paris on 8 February 1927, to a bourgeois family originally from Vire, Normandy. He attended the Collège Stanislas, where he earned a baccalauréat in literature and philosophy.

In 1949, at the age of 22, Mabire created the regionalist magazine Viking and in 1951 left Paris to settle in Cherbourg, Normandy, where he founded a graphic arts workshop. Mabire wrote the majority of the 162 articles published by the magazine until its end in 1958. Viking had 300 to 400 subscribers and the most popular issues sold around 1,000 copies. He regarded the Normans as part of the "Nordic race" and his magazine gave a great importance to Scandinavian cultures and Viking history.

Political activism 
In 1958, Mabire was sent as a reserved soldier to North Africa during the Algerian War (1954–62). Between 1963 and 1965, he wrote articles in Philippe Héduy's L'Esprit public, and was a contributor in Cahiers universitaires, the magazine of the Federation of Nationalist Students (FEN). In 1965, he was part of the grassroots committees of far-right presidential candidate Jean-Louis Tixier-Vignancour, and wrote in January a book to explain his endorsement.

From 1965, he served as the redactor-in-chief of Europe-Action, in which he wrote about neo-paganism, the Waffen SS and the Charlemagne Regiment. Mabire was one of the architects of the euro-nationalist break with the old French nationalism supported by the magazine. He supported instead a pan-European nationalism, decentralized and based on the identities of regions, seen as smaller ethnic nations, a thesis later embodied in Yann Fouéré's "Europe of 100 Flags", published in 1968. His shift towards the radical right was confirmed in many articles Mabire published in Le Spectacle du Monde, Valeurs Actuelles or Minute.

In 1968, Mabire became a founding member of the Mouvement Normand, and the following year he helped Georges Bernage establish Heimdal, a regionalist magazine and intellectual successor of Viking. Mabire wrote in Heimdal about Norman poets, Nordicism and Scandinavian mythology. The magazine was a success and sold at more than 3,000 copies. He became an active member of GRECE in 1970, and took part in its "federal council" and "commission of traditions".

In 1973, Mabire co-founded the neopagan scouting organization Europe-Jeunesse with Jean-Claude Valla and Maurice Rollet. The same year, Mabire's literary career began with the publication of a saga on the history of the French SS: La Brigade Frankreich, La Division Charlemagne and Mourir à Berlin. After his wife died from cancer in 1974, he remarried two years later and settled in the Parisian region. He participated, along with other GRECE members Pierre Vial and Jean Haudry, in the founding of the association Terre et Peuple in 1995.

Later life and death 
Jean Mabire died of leukemia on 29 March 2006 in Saint-Malo, Brittany, at the age of 79.

Controversy 
His books on the Waffen-SS have been regarded as a hagyographic and romantic rehabilitation of Nazism. Mabire describes for instance some units in those terms: "The SS carry the Prometheus torch and Sigurd's sword to the Caucasus. They are the sons of the old Germanic warriors who emerged from the ice and forests. They are the Teutonics who replaced the cross of Christ with the wheel of the Sun. They are Adolf Hitler's SS."

Works 

 On History
 Les Hors-la-loi. Robert Laffont, 1968; re-edited as Commando de chasse
 Les Samouraï, with Yves Bréhéret. Paris, Balland, 1971
 Les Waffen SS, under the pseudonym "Henri Landemer". Balland, 1972
 La Brigade Frankreich. Fayard, 1973
 Ungern, le Baron fou. Balland, 1973 ; corrected re-edition as Ungern, le dieu de la guerre and Ungern, l'héritier blanc de Genghis Khan
 La Division Charlemagne. Fayard, 1974
 Mourir à Berlin, Paris. Fayard, 1975
 Les Jeunes Fauves du Führer. La division SS Hitlerjugend en Normandie. Fayard, 1976
 L'Été rouge de Pékin. Fayard, 1978
 Les Panzers de la Garde Noire. Presse de la Cité, 1978
 La Division « Wiking ». Fayard, 1980
 Les Paras du matin rouge. Presses de la Cité, 1981
 La Crète, tombeau des paras Allemands. Presses de la Cité, 1982
 Chasseurs alpins. Des Vosges aux Djebels. Presses de la Cité, 1984; Écrivains Combattants prize
 Les Diables verts de Cassino. Presses de la Cité, 1991.
 Les Paras de l'enfer blanc, Front de l'Est 1941-1945. Presses de la Cité, 1995
 Division de choc Wallonie, Lutte à mort en Poméranie. Éditions Jacques Grancher, 1996
 Les Guerriers de la plus grande Asie. Dualpha, 2004
 On paganism
 Thulé, le soleil retrouvé des Hyperboréens. Paris, Robert Laffont, 1978.
 Les Solstices. Histoire et Actualité, with Pierre Vial. GRECE, 1975
 Les Dieux maudits. Copernic, 1978 ; re-edited as Légendes de la mythologie nordique
 Balades au cœur de l'Europe païenne (collective work). Les Éditions de la forêt, 2002.
 On Normandy
 Histoire de la Normandie, en collaboration avec Jean-Robert Ragache (Hachette, 1976 ; réédition : France-Empire, 1986, 1992) : awarded by the Mouvement Normand
 Les Vikings, rois des tempêtes, with Pierre Vial. Versoix, 1976 ; re-edited as Les Vikings à travers le monde
 La Saga de Godefroy Le Boiteux. Copernic, 1980 ; re-edited as Godefroy de Harcourt, seigneur normand
 Histoire secrète de la Normandie. Albin Michel, 1984
 Guillaume le Conquérant. Art et Histoire d'Europe, 1987
 Les Ducs de Normandie. Lavauzelle, 1987
 Grands Marins normands. L'Ancre de Marine, 1993
 Légendes traditionnelles de Normandie. L'Ancre de Marine, 1997
 Jean Mabire et le Mouvement Normand. Éditions de l'Esnesque, 1998
 Vikings : cahiers de la jeunesse des pays normands. Veilleur, 1999
 La Varende entre nous. Présence de La Varende, 1999
 Des poètes normands et de l'héritage nordique. Antée, 2003

References

Bibliography

Further reading 
 Francis Bergeron, Jean Mabire, écrivain de la guerre et de la mer, Paris, Dualpha, 2014.
 Patrice Mongondry, Mabire, Grez-sur-Loing, Pardès, coll. « Qui suis-je ? », 2018.

1927 births
2006 deaths
French modern pagans
Modern pagan writers
Pan-European nationalism
Modern paganism in France
New Right (Europe)
20th-century French journalists